Fractal Records is an independent French label created in September 1994, eclectic, focused on rock music, jazz, psychedelic, modern, avant-garde, free, punk, experimental, and especially that of Japan. He set up firstly a mail order catalogue "Sinusoïde" (1994/96) before starting his production work in 1997. In 2004, appears the label Sparkling Spare Wheel which is a subdivision of Fractal Records.

Catalogue - Fractal Records 

• Mainliner - Psychedelic Polyhedron - Vinyl LP (Fractal 001) 1997

• Igor Wakhévitch - Donc... - Coffret 6CDs (Fractal 002) 1998

• Seikazoku - Outtakes '66 '78 - CD (Fractal 003) 1998

• High Rise - Durophet - Vinyl LP (Fractal 004) 1999

• High Rise - Durophet - CD (Fractal 005) 1999

• Frank Wright Quartet - Center Of The World - CD + Bonus Tracks (Fractal 006) 1999

• Frank Wright Quartet - Last Polka In Nancy ? - CD + Bonus Tracks (Fractal 007) 1999

• Michel Bulteau - Rinçures - CD (Fractal 008) 1999

• Arthur Doyle & Sunny Murray - Dawn Of A New Vibration - CD (Fractal 009) 2000

• Iannis Xenakis - Persepolis - CD (Fractal 0X) 2000

• Kawabata & Pauvros - Extrême-Onction - CD (Fractal 011) 2001

• Ilitch - Periodikmindtrouble - 2CDs + Bonus Tracks (Fractal 012) 2001

• Ilitch - 10 Suicides - 2CDs + Bonus Tracks (Fractal 013) 2001

• Ruth - Polaroid Roman Photo - CD + Bonus Tracks (Fractal 014) 2001

• Iannis Xenakis - Musique Electro-Acoustique - CD (Fractal 015) 2001

• Fille Qui Mousse - Se Taire Pour Une Femme Trop Belle - CD (Fractal 016) 2001

• Jacques Berrocal - Musiq Musik - CD (Fractal 017) 2002

• Ohkami No Jikan - Mort Nuit - CD (Fractal 018) 2002

• Musica Transonic - Hard Rock Transonic - CD (Fractal 019) 2002

• Acid Mothers Temple & The Melting Paraiso UFO - Univers Zen Ou De Zéro A Zéro - CD (Fractal 020) 2002

• Acid Mothers Temple & The Melting Paraiso UFO - Electric Love Machine - EP Single (Fractal 0207) 2002

• Acid Mothers Temple & The Melting Paraiso UFO - Univers Zen Ou De Zéro A Zéro + Live In Europe - 4LPs (Fractal 020412) 2003

• Various Artists - Amaterasu - 2CDs (Fractal 021) 2003

• Knead - This Melting Happiness I Want You To Realize That It Is Another Trap - Vinyl LP (Fractal 023) 2003

• Ilitch - Hors Temps / Out Of Time - CD (Fractal 024) 2004

• Toho Sara - Hourouurin - CD (Fractal 025) 2004

• Musique Concret - Bringing Up Baby - CD (Fractal 026) 2004

• Asahito Nanjo Group Musica - Contemporary Kagura-Metaphysics - CD (Fractal 027) 2004

• Bernard Parmegiani - JazzEx - CD + Unreleased Live Track (Fractal 028) 2004

• Keiko Kojima - Taikoku No Kage - EP Single (Fractal 029) 2004

• Mainliner - Psychedelic Polyhedron - CD + Bonus Track (Fractal 030) 2004

• Mahogany Brain - Some Cocktail Suggestions - Vinyl LP (Fractal 173) 2005

• Acid Mothers Temple & The Pink Ladies Blues featuring the Sun Love and the Heavy Metal Thunder - 2 LPs (Fractal 174) 2006

• Acid Mothers Temple & The Pink Ladies Blues featuring the Sun Love and the Heavy Metal Thunder - CD (Fractal 179) 2006

• Bernard Parmegiani - Chants Magnétiques - CD (Fractal 180) 2007

• Acid Mothers Temple & The Pink Ladies Blues - The Soul Of A Mountain Wolf - Mini CD (Fractal 182) 2007

• Ilitch - Lena's Life And Other Stories - CD (Fractal 185) 2007

• Magic Aum Gigi - Starring Keiko - Vinyl LP (Fractal 189) 2007

• Diza Star & The Pink Ladies Blues - 3 - Vinyl LP (Fractal 190) 2007

• Diza Star & The Pink Ladies Blues - Featuring Mani Neumeier - CD (Fractal 194) 2007

• Thierry Müller - Rare & Unreleased 1974 -1984 - CD (Fractal 196) 2007

• Diza Star - Contact High Diza Star - CD (Fractal 300) 2008

• Déficit Des Années Antérieures - Action And Japanese Demonstration - CD + Bonus Tracks (Fractal 333) 2008

• Diza Star - Blues Reason To Live - EP Single (Fractal 666) 2009

• Circle X - Live In Dijon '79 - Vinyl 10 inch + Bonus Tracks (Fractal 700) 2009

• Vincent Le Masne & Bertrand Porquet - Guitares Dérive - CD + Bonus Track (Fractal 760) 2010

• Armand Frigico - L'après-Midi Chaud - Vinyl LP (Fractal 777) 2014

• Heratius Corporation-Armand Frigico - Pataphysic Power : The Underground Retrospective 2CDs (Fractal 800) 2014

• Sonorhc - Purf / Outrelande - CD (Fractal 820) 2014

• High Rise - Paris 1998 - DVD (Fractal 050) 2014

• Sonorhc - Portes d'Orient / Amazonia - CD (Fractal 840) 2015

• Le Bal Des Ardents - Le Mal Des Ardents - Vinyl LP (Fractal 878) 2016

Catalogue - Sparkling Spare Wheel 

• Magic Aum Gigi - MMMM (My Metal Machine Music) - LP (SSW-810) 2004

• Michel Bulteau & Elliott Murphy - Hero Poet - Mini LP (SSW-811) 2004

• Ilitch - Rainy House - LP Picture Disc + CDR + Bonus Tracks (SSW-812) 2005

• Asahito Nanjo - Greed - LP (SSW-813) 2005

External links 

French independent record labels
Record labels established in 1994